Barbara Bloom (born 1951, in Los Angeles) lives and works in New York City. She is a conceptual artist best known for her multi-media installation works. Bloom is loosely affiliated with a group of artists referred to as The Pictures Generation.
For nearly twenty years she lived in Europe, first in Amsterdam then Berlin. Since 1992, she has lived in New York City with her husband, the writer-composer Chris Mann, and their daughter.

Education 

Bloom attended Bennington College in Bennington, Vermont, from 1968 to 1969, and in 1972 received her BFA from the California Institute of the Arts in Valencia, California where her mentor was John Baldessari.

Work 

Bloom is a visual artist whose conceptual practice relies mainly on photography and installation. Beginning in the 1970s, Bloom has created work in a variety of different mediums including photography, installation, film, and books.

In conversation with Susan Tallman, Barbara Bloom has referred to herself as a “novelist who somehow ended up in a ‘visual artist’ queue”.
Bloom has often compared herself, and the viewer of her work, to a 'detective'  who is confronted with disparate clues and is asked to form some kind of visual narrative. Her work is often about the nature of looking. She engages her viewer, seducing him/her into a beautifully constructed visual world, one that is underlaid by subversive wrenches thrown in.

Bloom has an ongoing interest in the value and meaning we collectively and individually bestow upon objects and images. She has not been concerned with showing single objects or images, rather with highlighting the relationships between them, and the meanings implicit in their placement and combination. The objects are placeholders for thoughts, and when they are situated in proximity to one another, meanings can reverberate and ricochet off of each other. Additionally, Bloom states in an artist's statement that her "fascination is with the relationships between objects or images—and the meanings implicit in their placement and combination."

Bloom's use of shadows, traces, Braille, broken objects, partially-obstructed images, watermarks, and micro-images all demonstrate an ongoing interest in visualizing the fragile workings of memory, the invisible, the ephemeral, and the absent. These “aesthetic underdogs, sheltered under Bloom’s wing [...] provide yet another lens for looking at how we seek value in objects and why.”

“During the last year, I produced and exhibited a work titled The Weather... In this work, hovering in varying heights above the floor are carpets, each a subtle shade of gray-green-blue. The carpets have raised-dot patterns forming texts in Braille... The production of the carpets was a complex one, and it was not easy to find a manufacturer able to accurately produce the intricate patterns of raised dots. Working with Classic Rug Collections in New York, a factory in Thailand was found that could produce the work perfectly. ” (Bloom on her artistic process of creating The Weather)

Recognition 
DAAD, Berlin Artist's-in-Residence (1986)
Visual Artist's Fellowship in Photography, The National Endowment for the Arts  (1986)
The 43rd Venice Biennale - Due Mille Prize (1988)
John Simon Guggenheim Memorial Foundation Fellowship in Fine Arts (1988)
The Louis Comfort Tiffany Foundation Award (1989)
The Frederick Weisman Foundation Award (1991)
Wexner Center for the Arts Fellowship (1997)
Visual Artist's Fellowship in Photography, The National Endowment for the Arts  (2006)
Getty Research Institute Visiting Scholar (2007)
Wynn Newhouse Award (2009)
Visual Arts Grant, Foundation of Contemporary Arts (2016)

Exhibitions 

Bloom's work has been shown widely including exhibitions at: 
The Metropolitan Museum of Art, New York; The Museum of Modern Art, New York; Museum Boijmans van Beuningen, Rotterdam; Stedelijk Museum, Amsterdam; Museum of Contemporary Art, Los Angeles; the Venice Biennale; Kunstverein München, Munich; Art Gallery of New South Wales, Sydney; The Serpentine Gallery, London; Kunsthalle Zürich; Württembergischer Kunstverein, Stuttgart; Carnegie Museum of Art, Pittsburgh; Leo Castelli Gallery, New York; SITE Santa Fe; Louisiana Museum of Modern Art, Denmark; La Bienale de Venezuela, Caracas; Museum Friedricianum, Kassel; Parrish Art Museum, Southampton;  Wexner Center for the Arts; Cooper-Hewitt Design Museum; International Center of Photography, New York; Martin-Gropius-Bau, Berlin; The Jewish Museum, New York; The Front Triennial, The Allen Memorial Art Museum, Ohio.

She is represented by David Lewis Gallery, New York; Capitain Petzel, Berlin; Galleria Raffaella Cortese, Milano; and Galerie Gisela Capitain, Cologne.

Collections 

Barbara Bloom's works are featured in a variety of public collections including: Museum of Modern Art, New York; Metropolitan Museum of Art, New York; The Art Institute of Chicago; Los Angeles County Museum of Art; Stedelijk Museum, Amsterdam; Museum of Contemporary Art, Los Angeles; MAK Museum of Applied Art, Vienna; International Center of Photography, New York; Israel Museum, Jerusalem; Australian National Gallery, Canberra; Groninger Museum, The Netherlands; Museum of Contemporary Art, Helsinki, Finland; Yokohama Museum of Art, Yokohama, Japan, the CU Art Museum at the University of Colorado Boulder, among others.

Publications 
Gold Custody, Mack Books, 2021. With Ben Lerner
A Picture, A Thousand Words, David Lewis, New York, 2017
Gifts, Ludion, Antwerp, Belgium, 2015
The St. Petersburg Paradox, Swiss Institute, New York and Karma, New York, 2014
As it were... so to speak: a museum collection in dialogue with Barbara Bloom, The Jewish Museum, New York, 2013
Between Artists: John Baldessari and Barbara Bloom, A.R.T. Press, New York, 2011
The Collections of Barbara Bloom, Bloom, Dave Hickey, Susan Tallman, Steidl, and International Center of Photography, NY, 2008
Flash Cards, The Renaissance Society, Chicago, 2003
Broken, Bloom and Miller, J. Abbott, Pentagram Papers, New York, 2001
Dinge in der Kunst des XX. Jahrhunderts, Haus der Kunst, München, 2000
Revised Evidence: Nabokov’s Inscriptions, Annotations. Glenn Horowitz Bookseller, New York, 1999
The Museum As Muse: Artists Reflect, the Museum of Modern Art, New York, 1999
Pictures From The Floating World, Sala de Exposiciones Rekalde, D.L, Bilbao, 1998
 Contemplation: Five Installations: Barbara Bloom, Ann Hamilton With Kathryn Clark, Nam June Paik, Robert Ryman, James Turrell, Des Moines Art Center, Des Moines, Iowa, 1996
Consider The Alternatives: 20 Years Of Contemporary Art At Hallwalls, Hallwalls Contemporary Arts Center, Buffalo, New York, 1996
Longing And Belonging: From The Faraway Nearby: Site Santa Fe, July 14 To October 8, 1995, Santa Fe, New Mexico, SITE Santa Fe, Santa Fe, New Mexico, 1995
The Passions Of Natasha, Nokiko, Nicole, Nanette And Norma, Cantz Verlag, Stuttgart, 1993
Never Odd Or Even. Verlag Silke Schreiber, Munich & The Carnegie Museum of Art, Pittsburgh, 1992
De wooden en de beelden: tekst en beeld in de kunst van de twintigste eeuw, Utrecht Centraal Museum, Utrecht, 1991
El Jardín salvaje, La Fundacion, Madrid, 1990
Life size : a sense of the real in recent art, The Israel Museum, Jerusalem, 1990
The Indomitable spirit : photographers and artists respond to the time of AIDS, Photographers + Friends United Against AIDS, New York, 1990
The Reign of Narcissism. Wurtembergischer Kunstverein, The Serpentine Gallery, Kunsthalle Zurich, 1990
The Readymade boomerang : certain relations in 20th-century art, Art Gallery of New South Wales, 11 April-3 June 1990, the eighth Biennale of Sydney, Art Gallery of New S. Wales, Sydney, 1990
Assembled, Wright State University, Dayton, Ohio, 1990
Die Endlichkeit Der Freiheit Berlin 1990: Ein Ausstellungsprojekt In Ost Und West, Edition Hentrich, Berlin, 1990
Ghost Writer, Passagen Verlag, Vienna, 1992 (original version  DAAD Berlin, 1986)
Picture This: Films Chosen By Artists, Hallwalls Contemporary Arts Center, Buffalo, New York, 1987
Lost and Found, Gemeentemuseum Arnhem, Arnhem, the Netherlands, 1987
Esprit de l’Escalier. Hallwalls, Buffalo, New York, 1986
A Calendar on Travel and Tourism, Mart.Spruijt, Amsterdam, 1986
Soundtrack to The French Diplomat’s Office. Bloom & Christian Marclay, BlumArts, NY, 1999

Teaching 

Bloom has held teaching positions at:
Cooper Union School of Art, New York; ICP-Bard Program in Advanced Photographic Studies; Art Institute of Boston at Lesley University; Columbia University-School of the Arts; Yale University- Graduate Department of Sculpture; School of Visual Arts, New York, Rijksakademie van Beeldende Kunsten, Amsterdam.

References

External links 
Artist Project: Barbara Bloom
Barbara Bloom by Kiki Smith
A Portrait of the Artist, in Bits and Pieces
Barbara Bloom, "Present"
Archives of American Art, Smithsonian Institution: Oral History Interview

1951 births
Living people
Artists from Los Angeles
Women conceptual artists
American conceptual artists
Bennington College alumni
California Institute of the Arts alumni
21st-century American women artists